Mary Leach may refer to:

Mary Ethel Leach (1850/51–1936), British politician
Mary Frances Leach (1858–1939), American chemist
Mary Jane Leach, American composer